Open Tee Bioscope is a 2015 Bengali language Indian coming-of-age comedy-drama film released on 15 January 2015, directed by director Anindya Chatterjee, who is the well known vocalist of the band Chandrabindu.  The film is a coming of age story of an adolescent boy and his friends.

Cast
 Riddhi Sen as Fowara 
 Rwitobroto Mukherjee as Kochua 
 Dhee Majumder as Charan 
 Rajarshi Nag as Gopeshan
 Jishnu Bandyopadhyay as Tukai 
 Surangana Bandopadhyay as Titir 
 Rajatava Dutta as Gopeshwar 
 Sudipta Chakraborty as Fowara's mother, Boishakhi
 Kamalika Banerjee as neighbourhood women
 Kaushik Sen as Mahim Halder
 Paran Bandopadhyay as Noton Da
 Sohini Sarkar as Iraboti 
 Ambarish Bhattacharya as Herombo
 Aparajita Auddy as Gopeshwar's wife
 Biswanath Basu as Pulish
 Sudipa Basu as Gopeswar's mother
 Damini Beni Basu
 Oindrila Saha
 Ritwick Chakraborty as grown-up Fowara [Guest Appearance] 
 Saptarshi Basu Roy Chowdhury

Plot

The film steers through comedy, drama, and emotions of the middle class community of 1990's Kolkata, and carefully captures the essence of North Kolkata, and the quintessential spirit of North Kolkata's para football.

Music
The soundtrack is composed by Upal Sengupta. The song "Bondhu chol" and the Cycle Theme are composed by guest music director Shantanu Moitra.

See also
 Projapoti Biskut

References

External links
 

Indian coming-of-age comedy-drama films
Bengali-language Indian films
2010s Bengali-language films
Films set in Kolkata